The Kia Cerato (also known as the Kia Forte in North America, K3 in South Korea or the Forte K3 or Shuma in China) is a compact car produced by the South Korean manufacturer Kia since 2003. In 2008, the Cerato nameplate was replaced by the Forte nameplate in the North American market and the K3 nameplate in South Korea. However, the "Cerato" name remains in use in markets such as Australasia, Middle East and Latin America. It is available in five-door hatchback, two-door coupe and four-door sedan variants. It is not available in Europe, where the similar sized Kia Ceed is offered (except for Russia and Ukraine, where the Cee'd and the Cerato are both available).

In some markets, such as North America, the Cerato is marketed as the Kia Forte replacing the Spectra nameplate of previous generations. In Colombia and Singapore, the name Cerato Forte was used for the second generation, while Naza Automotive Manufacturing of Malaysia has assembled the vehicle since 2009, selling it there under the name Naza Forte.


First generation (LD; 2003) 

The Kia Cerato was introduced in South Korea in 2003, sharing a platform with the Hyundai Elantra (XD) and using Hyundai's Beta II (G4GC) (CVVT-enabled) four-cylinder engine. It replaced the Sephia/Mentor sedan and Shuma hatchback.

In North America, the "Spectra" name was used when introduced for the 2004 model year, with "Spectra5" designating the hatchback. For Latin American markets, the Cerato was still named Sephia until 2005, when it was discontinued in favor of the name Spectra. In Europe, the Cerato was replaced by the Kia Cee'd.

For the Malaysian market, the first generation Spectra was launched in Malaysia on August 15, 2007 as the "Spectra5" available only with one trim level and with the hatchback bodystyle powered by a 1.6-litre, four-cylinder, 16-valve, DOHC CVVT engine with a 4-speed automatic transmission.

Facelift 
In 2006, a facelift version was introduced, including revised Gamma engines. Stylistically, the bumper and  headlamps lost their pronounced crease near the grille area, the trunk lid became more rounded, and the tail lights were reshaped.

Kia Cerato R and Horki 300EV
The Kia Cerato R is the extensive facelift of the Kia Cerato to extend sales within the Chinese market, while the second generation Kia Cerato was sold as the Kia Forte in China at the same time. The design was significantly updated to be in line with other newer Kia products. The Horki 300EV is an compact electric sedan with the design being essentially a rebadged version of the Kia Cerato R from the Chinese market, it was unveiled on the 2016 Auto Guangzhou. The platform is the same as the first generation Kia Cerato, which is still in production in China as the Cerato R.

Second generation (TD; 2008) 

The second generation Kia Cerato was launched in South Korea in late 2008 under the Kia Forte name – a name that was used in most international markets. The "Cerato" name has been retained in some markets, such as Australia, Middle East, South Africa and Brazil. In Singapore, the second generation model is badged "Kia Cerato Forte".

Hatchback

Sedan

Coupe (Koup)

Third generation (YD; 2012) 

Kia released images of the third generation Cerato for the 2014 model year in late July 2012, when the company revealed its Korean-market counterpart, Kia K3. The car is completely redesigned with a lower, wider, and longer stance.

Hatchback

Sedan

Coupe

Fourth generation (BD; 2018) 

The fourth generation Cerato was unveiled as the Forte on January 15, 2018 at the 2018 North American International Auto Show in Detroit, Michigan. Entering its third generation, a more sophisticated design and desirable features transform one of Kia's best-selling vehicles into something more than a compact car for taking people going from one point to another. Thanks to a number of improvements, Cerato now offers greater driver comfort, fuel economy and advanced driver assistance technologies.

Sales

References 

Cerato
Compact cars
Euro NCAP small family cars
Front-wheel-drive vehicles
Sedans
Hatchbacks
Cars introduced in 2003
2010s cars